Acropoma boholensis is a species of ray-finned fish, a lanternbelly from the family Acropomatidae which is found in the western Pacific Ocean around the Philippines.

References

boholensis
Fish described in 2002